Artemis (minor planet designation: 105 Artemis) is a main-belt asteroid that was discovered by J. C. Watson on September 16, 1868, at Ann Arbor, Michigan. It was named after Artemis, the goddess of the hunt, Moon, and crossways in Greek Mythology.

It is a C-type asteroid, meaning that it is very dark and composed of carbonaceous material. Although it shares a similar orbit to the Phocaea family of S-type asteroids, its classification means 105 Artemis is not a member. The spectra of the asteroid displays evidence of aqueous alteration.

In 1988, this object was detected with radar from the Arecibo Observatory at a distance of 1.07 AU. The measured radar cross-section was 1,800 km2. Photometric measurement of this asteroid made in 2010 at Organ Mesa Observatory in Las Cruces, New Mexico, produced an irregular light curve with a period of 37.150 ± 0.001 hours. During each rotation, the brightness varies by 0.16 ± 0.01 in magnitude.

Based upon radar data, the estimated near surface solid density of the asteroid is
3.0. Refined observations by the Arecibo Observatory, reported in 2006, showed a complex surface with varying albedo. Analysis of the spectra of 105 Artemis shows the presence of hydrated minerals at some rotation angles, but not at others.

An occultation of the star HD 197999 was observed in 1982, which gave an estimated chord length of 110 km. Between 1981 and 2021, 105 Artemis has been observed to occult 23 stars.

References

External links 
 
 

000105
Discoveries by James Craig Watson
Named minor planets
000105
000105
000105
18680916